Knowledge Management Research & Practice (KMRP) is a peer-reviewed academic journal covering all aspects of managing knowledge, organisational learning, intellectual capital and knowledge economics. It is an official journal of the Operational Research Society. According to its homepage, it has also been accepted in Thomson Reuters Social Sciences Citation Index and its current impact factor is 2.744, according to the 2020 Journal Citation Reports (Clarivate Analytics, 2020).

Abstracting and indexing 
The journal is currently abstracted and indexed in the Association of Business Schools' Academic Journal Quality Guide, Compendex, EMBASE, EMNursing, GEOBASE, International Abstracts in Operations Research, International Bibliography of Periodical Literature on the Humanities and Social Sciences, International Bibliography of Book Reviews of Scholarly Literature on the Humanities and Social Sciences, International Bibliography of the Social Sciences, Mosby Yearbooks, and Scopus.

External links 
 

Knowledge management journals
Publications established in 2003
English-language journals
Palgrave Macmillan academic journals
Operational Research Society academic journals